This article details the qualifying phase for shooting at the 2020 Summer Olympics (which was postponed to at least 2021 due to the COVID-19 pandemic). 300 quota places for the Games are entitled to the shooters coming from their respective NOCs, based on the results at designated ISSF supervised Championships subjected to the ISSF rules from September 1, 2018, to June 6, 2021. Host nation Japan has been guaranteed twelve quota places with one in each of the individual events. Four quota places (top two teams per NOC) will be awarded to the shooters competing in each of the mixed team events (rifle, pistol, and trap), while the highest-ranked shooter, who has not qualified yet or whose NOC does not have a berth in any of the twelve individual events, will obtain a direct Olympic quota place through the World Rankings. The remaining twenty-four quota places are available to the eligible NOCs under the Tripartite Commission Invitation, with two in each of the individual event, to attain a maximum number of 360.

Quota places can be obtained at the 2018 ISSF World Championships, the 2019 ISSF World Cup series, and the designated Continental Championships or Games during the qualifying period. Quota places are allocated only to the National Olympic Committees, with the exception of the ISSF world rankings, which are awarded directly to the individual shooters and may not be changed by the NOC. The NOC may assign a different shooter in each individual or mixed team event, provided that he or she has attained a minimum qualification score (MQS).

Timeline

Qualification summary

50 m rifle three positions men

10 m air rifle men

25 m rapid fire pistol men

10 m air pistol men

Trap men

Skeet men

50 m rifle three positions women

10 m air rifle women

25 m pistol women

10 m air pistol women

Trap women

Skeet women

Mixed rifle team

Mixed pistol team

Mixed trap team

See also
 Shooting at the 2020 Summer Paralympics – Qualification

Notes

References

Qualification for the 2020 Summer Olympics
Qualification
Olympics
Olympics
Olympics